Dusty Blue is an album by trumpeter Howard McGhee which was recorded in 1960 and released on the Bethlehem label.

Reception

Allmusic reviewer Ken Dryden stated: " With the exception of Together Again with Teddy Edwards, the 1950s had largely been a waste for Howard McGhee, as drug addiction had taken its toll on his playing. But he is in good form for this 1961 studio session for Bethlehem".

Track listing 
All compositions by Howard McGhee, except as indicated
 "Dusty Blue" - 2:53
 "The Sound of Music" (Oscar Hammerstein II, Richard Rodgers) - 3:22
 "I Concentrate on You" (Cole Porter) - 4:06
 "Sleep Talk" - 2:55
 "Park Avenue Petite (From Dream To Dream)" (Benny Golson) - 3:32
 "Flyin' Colors" - 5:52
 "With Malice Towards None" (Tom McIntosh) - 4:02
 "Groovin' High" (Dizzy Gillespie) - 4:19
 "A Cottage for Sale" (Larry Conley, Willard Robison) - 4:28

Personnel 
Howard McGhee - trumpet
Bennie Green - trombone (tracks 1, 5, 6 & 8)
Roland Alexander - tenor saxophone  (tracks 1, 5, 6 & 8)
Pepper Adams - baritone saxophone  (tracks 1, 5, 6 & 8)
Tommy Flanagan - piano
Ron Carter - bass
Walter Bolden - drums

References 

 

Howard McGhee albums
1961 albums
Bethlehem Records albums